Anastasiia Ihorivna Todorova (born 10 December 1993) is a Ukrainian canoeist. She competed in the women's K-2 500 metres event at the 2016 Summer Olympics. She also won medals at the European Championships.

References

External links
 

1993 births
Living people
Ukrainian female canoeists
Olympic canoeists of Ukraine
Canoeists at the 2016 Summer Olympics
Canoeists at the 2020 Summer Olympics
Place of birth missing (living people)
European Games bronze medalists for Ukraine
Canoeists at the 2015 European Games
Canoeists at the 2019 European Games
European Games medalists in canoeing
21st-century Ukrainian women